Below are the squads for the 2022 AFF U-23 Championship, which takes place between  14 to 26 February 2022.

Group A

Cambodia
Head coach :  Ryu Hirose

|-----
! colspan=9 style="background:#0000FF" align="left" |
|----- bgcolor="#DFEDFD"

|-----
! colspan=9 style="background:#0000FF" align="left" |
|----- bgcolor="#DFEDFD"

|-----
! colspan=9 style="background:#0000FF" align="left" |
|----- bgcolor="#DFEDFD"

Timor Leste
Head oach:  Fábio Magrão

Philippines
Head coach:  Stewart Hall

The final squad was announced on 10 February 2022.

Brunei
Head coach:  Aminuddin Jumat

The final squad was announced on 8 February 2022.

Group B

Malaysia
Head coach:  Brad Maloney

Laos
Head coach:  Michael Weiß

Group C

Thailand
Head coach:  Salva Valero Garcia

The final squad was announced on 1 February 2022.

Vietnam
Head coach:  Đinh Thế Nam

Singapore
Head coach:  Nazri Nasir

References 

AFF U-22 Youth Championship